John William Isaacs (September 15, 1915 – January 26, 2009) was a Panamanian-American professional basketball player. Born in Panama but raised in New York City, he was a member of the New York Renaissance, the Washington Bears, and various other teams.

Life and career
Isaacs was born in 1915 in Panama to a Jamaican father and a Panamanian mother. He grew up bilingual in Harlem, speaking both English and Spanish. Isaacs was a 6'3", 190 lbs. guard who led the basketball team at Textile High School (later Charles Evans Hughes High School) to a title in the 1935 New York City High School Basketball championship with all-City honors for himself. Offered a professional contract by Bob Douglas, owner of the Harlem-based, all-African American New York Renaissance basketball team, he accepted the offer, but only after getting approval from his mother.

With the Rens, Isaacs led the team to season records of 122–19, 121–19, and 127–15. The team won the first World Professional Basketball Tournament, held in 1939 at Chicago Stadium and sponsored by the Chicago Herald American, with the team making it to the finals by beating the Harlem Globetrotters of Chicago 27–23, to face the Oshkosh All-Stars, who lost to the Rens 34–25 in the tournament final. Isaacs won a second title in 1943 with the Washington Bears, again defeating Oshkosh. Isaacs scored a game-high 11 points to lead the Bears to a  43–31 win and their first title. Paid $175 per month, plus expenses, to play basketball. Isaacs supplemented his professional salary with jobs on the assembly line at Grumman Aircraft and at New York Life Insurance during the off season.

Isaacs played with several other all-black professional basketball teams after his time with the Rens and Bears, including the Manhattan Nationals, Hazleton Mountaineers of the Eastern Professional Basketball League, and Utica Olympics of the New York State Professional Basketball League), and in the American Basketball League with Brooklyn and Saratoga. He became a coach and mentor after he retired.  Chris Mullin admitted that he was one of his disciples.

Long after retiring from professional sports, Isaacs won medals at the New York State Senior Games in tennis, Frisbee, softball throwing, as well as in basketball.

On February 14, 2015, Isaacs was announced as a member of that year's induction class of the Naismith Memorial Basketball Hall of Fame. He formally entered the Hall on September 11.

References

External links
 "John Isaacs, Star for Rens Basketball, Dies at 93,"  New York Times, February 4, 2009

1915 births
2009 deaths
African-American basketball players
American Basketball League (1925–1955) players
American men's basketball players
American people of Jamaican descent
American sportspeople of Panamanian descent
Basketball players from New York City
Dayton Rens players
Harlem Globetrotters players
New York Renaissance players
Panamanian emigrants to the United States
Panamanian men's basketball players
Panamanian people of Jamaican descent
People from Harlem
Sportspeople from Manhattan
Guards (basketball)
20th-century African-American sportspeople
21st-century African-American people